Death Before Dishonor or Death Before Dishonour may refer to:

 Death Before Dishonor (album), the debut album by rapper 2 Pistols
 Death Before Dishonor (band), an American heavy hardcore band from Boston, Massachusetts
 Death Before Dishonor (film), a 1987 American action film directed by Terry Leonard
 "Death Before Dishonor", a song from Five Finger Death Punch's 2007 album The Way of the Fist
 Death Before Dishonor, a 1989 album from Dennis Brown containing a song of the same name
 Death Before Dishonour, the fifth studio album by the Scottish punk rock band The Exploited
 ROH Death Before Dishonor, a professional wrestling event